Camp Whelen, a Christian summer camp for young girls, was founded in the early 1920s after the former Harvey Cedars Hotel was purchased by the Philadelphia YWCA.

Camp Whelen survived until the Depression. After shutting down due to declining attendance, the hotel was abandoned for about 10 years.  After this, it was purchased and turned into Harvey Cedars Bible Conference.

For more old photographs of the building, see also: Harvey Cedars Hotel and Harvey Cedars Bible Conference as they occupied the same building.

Hotels in New Jersey
Whelen